Thomas Yorke or York may refer to:

Thomas Yorke (1658–1716), English politician
Thomas Yorke (1688–1768), English businessman and MP for Richmond, Yorkshire
Thomas Jones Yorke (1801–1882), American politician
Thom Yorke (born 1968), English musician
Thomas York (1850–1910), New South Wales politician

See also 
 Tom York (disambiguation)